Heli Air Services is a charter airline based in Sofia, Bulgaria.

History
The airline was founded in 1990. The airline mainly transports passengers, cargo and mail. In the beginning, Heli Air only operated helicopters and subsequently incorporated the Antonov An-12, Antonov An-24, Cessna and Let L-410 into its fleet. Since 1999 Heli Air started to operate primarily on programs of United Nations and World Food Programme (UN - WFP), and performed thousands of flying hours in difficult accessible locations and troubled countries such as Angola, Guinea, Mozambique, Ivory Coast, Sierra Leone, Sudan, Afghanistan and others.

Fleet
The Heli Air fleet includes the following aircraft:

4 Let L-410
4 Mi-8

References

External links
Official website

Airlines of Bulgaria
Airlines established in 1990
Helicopter airlines
Bulgarian companies established in 1990